Yawiyo (Yabio) is a Sepik language spoken in East Sepik Province, Papua-New Guinea.

References

Languages of East Sepik Province
Languages of Sandaun Province
Walio languages